Phillips' small-eared shrew or Phillips' short-eared shrew (Cryptotis phillipsii) is a species of mammal in the family Soricidae found in Mexico.

References

Cryptotis
Mammals of Mexico
Mammals of Central America
Mammals described in 1966